Country (also called country and western) is a music genre originating in the Southern and Southwestern United States. First produced in the 1920s, country primarily focuses on working class Americans and blue-collar American life.

Country music is known for its ballads and dance tunes (also known as "honky-tonk music") with simple form, folk lyrics, and harmonies accompanied by instruments such as banjos, fiddles, harmonicas, and many types of guitar (including acoustic, electric, steel, and resonator guitars). Though it is primarily rooted in various forms of American folk music, such as old-time music and Appalachian music, many other traditions, including African-American, Mexican, Irish, and Hawaiian music, have also had a formative influence on the genre. Blues modes have been used extensively throughout its recorded history.

The term country music gained popularity in the 1940s in preference to hillbilly music; it came to encompass Western music, which evolved parallel to hillbilly music from similar roots, in the mid-20th century. Contemporary styles of Western music include Texas country, red dirt, and Hispano- and Mexican American-led Tejano and New Mexico music, all extant alongside longstanding indigenous traditions.

In 2009, in the United States, country music was the most listened to rush hour radio genre during the evening commute, and second most popular in the morning commute.

Origins

The main components of the modern country music style date back to music traditions throughout the Southern United States and Southwestern United States, while its place in American popular music was established in the 1920s during the early days of music recording. According to country historian Bill C. Malone, country music was "introduced to the world as a Southern phenomenon."

Migration into the southern Appalachian Mountains, of the Southeastern United States, brought the folk music and instruments of Europe, Africa, and the Mediterranean Basin along with it for nearly 300 years, which developed into Appalachian music. As the country expanded westward, the Mississippi River and Louisiana became a crossroads for country music, giving rise to Cajun music. In the Southwestern United States, it was the Rocky Mountains, American frontier, and Rio Grande that acted as a similar backdrop for Native American, Mexican, and cowboy ballads, which resulted in New Mexico music and the development of Western music, and its directly related Red Dirt, Texas country, and Tejano music styles. In the Asia-Pacific, the steel guitar sound of country music has its provenance in the music of Hawaii.

Role of East Tennessee

The U.S. Congress has formally recognized Bristol, Tennessee as the "Birthplace of Country Music", based on the historic Bristol recording sessions of 1927. Since 2014, the city has been home to the Birthplace of Country Music Museum. Historians have also noted the influence of the less-known Johnson City sessions of 1928 and 1929, and the Knoxville sessions of 1929 and 1930. In addition, the Mountain City Fiddlers Convention, held in 1925, helped to inspire modern country music. Before these, pioneer settlers, in the Great Smoky Mountains region, had developed a rich musical heritage.

Generations
The first generation emerged in the 1920s, with Atlanta's music scene playing a major role in launching country's earliest recording artists. James Gideon "Gid" Tanner (1885–1960) was an American old-time fiddler and one of the earliest stars of what would come to be known as country music. His band, the Skillet Lickers, was one of the most innovative and influential string bands of the 1920s and 1930s. Its most notable members were Clayton McMichen (fiddle and vocal), Dan Hornsby (vocals), Riley Puckett (guitar and vocal) and Robert Lee Sweat (guitar). New York City record label Okeh Records began issuing hillbilly music records by Fiddlin' John Carson as early as 1923, followed by Columbia Records (series 15000D "Old Familiar Tunes") (Samantha Bumgarner) in 1924, and RCA Victor Records in 1927 with the first famous pioneers of the genre Jimmie Rodgers, who is widely considered the "Father of Country Music", and the first family of country music the Carter Family. Many "hillbilly" musicians recorded blues songs throughout the 1920s.

During the second generation (1930s–1940s), radio became a popular source of entertainment, and "barn dance" shows featuring country music were started all over the South, as far north as Chicago, and as far west as California. The most important was the Grand Ole Opry, aired starting in 1925 by WSM in Nashville and continuing to the present day. During the 1930s and 1940s, cowboy songs, or Western music, which had been recorded since the 1920s, were popularized by films made in Hollywood, many featuring Gene Autry, who was known as king of the "singing cowboys",  and Hank Williams. Bob Wills was another country musician from the Lower Great Plains who had become very popular as the leader of a "hot string band," and who also appeared in Hollywood westerns. His mix of country and jazz, which started out as dance hall music, would become known as Western swing. Wills was one of the first country musicians known to have added an electric guitar to his band, in 1938. Country musicians began recording boogie in 1939, shortly after it had been played at Carnegie Hall, when Johnny Barfield recorded "Boogie Woogie".

The third generation (1950s–1960s) started at the end of World War II with "mountaineer" string band music known as bluegrass, which emerged when Bill Monroe, along with Lester Flatt and Earl Scruggs were introduced by Roy Acuff at the Grand Ole Opry. Gospel music remained a popular component of country music. The Native American, Hispano, and American frontier music of the Southwestern United States and Northern Mexico, became popular among poor communities in New Mexico, Oklahoma, and Texas; the basic ensemble consisted of classical guitar, bass guitar, dobro or steel guitar, though some larger ensembles featured electric guitars, trumpets, keyboards (especially the honky-tonk piano, a type of tack piano), banjos, and drums. By the early 1950s it blended with rock and roll, becoming the rockabilly sound produced by Sam Phillips, Norman Petty, and Bob Keane. Musicians like Elvis Presley, Bo Diddley, Buddy Holly, Jerry Lee Lewis, Ritchie Valens, Carl Perkins, Roy Orbison, and Johnny Cash emerged as enduring representatives of the style. Beginning in the mid-1950s, and reaching its peak during the early 1960s, the Nashville sound turned country music into a multimillion-dollar industry centered in Nashville, Tennessee; Patsy Cline and Jim Reeves were two of the most broadly popular Nashville sound artists, and their deaths in separate plane crashes in the early 1960s were a factor in the genre's decline. Starting in the 1950s to the mid-1960s, Western singer-songwriters such as Michael Martin Murphey and Marty Robbins rose in prominence as did others, throughout Western music traditions, like New Mexico music's Al Hurricane. The late 1960s in American music produced a unique blend as a result of traditionalist backlash within separate genres. In the aftermath of the British Invasion, many desired a return to the "old values" of rock n' roll. At the same time there was a lack of enthusiasm in the country sector for Nashville-produced music. What resulted was a crossbred genre known as country rock.

Fourth generation (1970s–1980s) music included outlaw country with roots in the Bakersfield sound, and country pop with roots in the countrypolitan, folk music and soft rock. Between 1972 and 1975 singer/guitarist John Denver released a series of hugely successful songs blending country and folk-rock musical styles. By the mid-1970s, Texas country and Tejano music gained popularity with performers like Freddie Fender. During the early 1980s country artists continued to see their records perform well on the pop charts. In 1980 a style of "neocountry disco music" was popularized. During the mid-1980s a group of new artists began to emerge who rejected the more polished country-pop sound that had been prominent on radio and the charts in favor of more traditional "back-to-basics" production.

During the fifth generation (1990s), neotraditionalists and stadium country acts prospered.

The sixth generation (2000s–present) has seen a certain amount of diversification in regard to country music styles. It has also, however, seen a shift into patriotism and conservative politics since the 9/11 Terrorist Attacks, but twenty years later, many are saying the genre is finally starting to move away from that. The influence of rock music in country has become more overt during the late 2000s and early 2010s. Most of the best-selling country songs of this era were those by Lady A, Florida Georgia Line, Carrie Underwood, and Taylor Swift. Hip hop also made its mark on country music with the emergence of country rap.

History

First generation (1920s)

The first commercial recordings of what was considered instrumental music in the traditional country style were "Arkansas Traveler" and "Turkey in the Straw" by fiddlers Henry Gilliland & A.C. (Eck) Robertson on June 30, 1922, for Victor Records and released in April 1923. Columbia Records began issuing records with "hillbilly" music (series 15000D "Old Familiar Tunes") as early as 1924.

The first commercial recording of what is widely considered to be the first country song featuring vocals and lyrics was Fiddlin' John Carson with "Little Log Cabin in the Lane" for Okeh Records on June 14, 1923.

Vernon Dalhart was the first country singer to have a nationwide hit in May 1924 with "Wreck of the Old 97". The flip side of the record was "Lonesome Road Blues", which also became very popular. In April 1924, "Aunt" Samantha Bumgarner and Eva Davis became the first female musicians to record and release country songs. Many of the early country musicians, such as the yodeler Cliff Carlisle, recorded blues songs into the 1930s. Other important early recording artists were Riley Puckett, Don Richardson, Fiddlin' John Carson, Uncle Dave Macon, Al Hopkins, Ernest V. Stoneman, Blind Alfred Reed, Charlie Poole and the North Carolina Ramblers and the Skillet Lickers. The steel guitar entered country music as early as 1922, when Jimmie Tarlton met famed Hawaiian guitarist Frank Ferera on the West Coast.

Jimmie Rodgers and the Carter Family are widely considered to be important early country musicians. From Scott County, Virginia, the Carters had learned sight reading of hymnals and sheet music using solfege. Their songs were first captured at a historic recording session in Bristol, Tennessee, on August 1, 1927, where Ralph Peer was the talent scout and sound recordist. A scene in the movie O Brother, Where Art Thou? depicts a similar occurrence in the same timeframe.

Rodgers fused hillbilly country, gospel, jazz, blues, pop, cowboy, and folk, and many of his best songs were his compositions, including "Blue Yodel", which sold over a million records and established Rodgers as the premier singer of early country music. Beginning in 1927, and for the next 17 years, the Carters recorded some 300 old-time ballads, traditional tunes, country songs and gospel hymns, all representative of America's southeastern folklore and heritage. Maybelle Carter went on to continue the family tradition with her daughters as The Carter Sisters; her daughter June would marry (in succession) Carl Smith, Rip Nix and Johnny Cash, having children with each who would also become country singers.

Second generation (1930s–1940s)

Record sales declined during the Great Depression, but radio became a popular source of entertainment, and "barn dance" shows featuring country music were started by radio stations all over the South, as far north as Chicago, and as far west as California.

The most important was the Grand Ole Opry, aired starting in 1925 by WSM in Nashville and continuing to the present day. Some of the early stars on the Opry were Uncle Dave Macon, Roy Acuff and African American harmonica player DeFord Bailey. WSM's 50,000-watt signal (in 1934) could often be heard across the country. Many musicians performed and recorded songs in any number of styles. Moon Mullican, for example, played Western swing but also recorded songs that can be called rockabilly. Between 1947 and 1949, country crooner Eddy Arnold placed eight songs in the top 10. From 1945 to 1955 Jenny Lou Carson was one of the most prolific songwriters in country music.

Singing cowboys and western swing

In the 1930s and 1940s, cowboy songs, or Western music, which had been recorded since the 1920s, were popularized by films made in Hollywood. Some of the popular singing cowboys from the era were Gene Autry, the Sons of the Pioneers, and Roy Rogers. Country music and western music were frequently played together on the same radio stations, hence the term country and western music, despite Country and Western being two distinct genres.

Cowgirls contributed to the sound in various family groups. Patsy Montana opened the door for female artists with her history-making song "I Want To Be a Cowboy's Sweetheart". This would begin a movement toward opportunities for women to have successful solo careers. Bob Wills was another country musician from the Lower Great Plains who had become very popular as the leader of a "hot string band," and who also appeared in Hollywood westerns. His mix of country and jazz, which started out as dance hall music, would become known as Western swing. Cliff Bruner, Moon Mullican, Milton Brown and Adolph Hofner were other early Western swing pioneers. Spade Cooley and Tex Williams also had very popular bands and appeared in films. At its height, Western swing rivaled the popularity of big band swing music.

Changing instrumentation
Drums were scorned by early country musicians as being "too loud" and "not pure", but by 1935 Western swing big band leader Bob Wills had added drums to the Texas Playboys. In the mid-1940s, the Grand Ole Opry did not want the Playboys' drummer to appear on stage. Although drums were commonly used by rockabilly groups by 1955, the less-conservative-than-the-Grand-Ole-Opry Louisiana Hayride kept its infrequently used drummer back stage as late as 1956. By the early 1960s, however, it was rare for a country band not to have a drummer. Bob Wills was one of the first country musicians known to have added an electric guitar to his band, in 1938. A decade later (1948) Arthur Smith achieved top 10 US country chart success with his MGM Records recording of "Guitar Boogie", which crossed over to the US pop chart, introducing many people to the potential of the electric guitar. For several decades Nashville session players preferred the warm tones of the Gibson and Gretsch archtop electrics, but a "hot" Fender style, using guitars which became available beginning in the early 1950s, eventually prevailed as the signature guitar sound of country.

Hillbilly boogie
Country musicians began recording boogie in 1939, shortly after it had been played at Carnegie Hall, when Johnny Barfield recorded "Boogie Woogie". The trickle of what was initially called hillbilly boogie, or okie boogie (later to be renamed country boogie), became a flood beginning in late 1945. One notable release from this period was the Delmore Brothers' "Freight Train Boogie", considered to be part of the combined evolution of country music and blues towards rockabilly. In 1948, Arthur "Guitar Boogie" Smith achieved top ten US country chart success with his MGM Records recordings of "Guitar Boogie" and "Banjo Boogie", with the former crossing over to the US pop charts. Other country boogie artists included Moon Mullican, Merrill Moore and Tennessee Ernie Ford. The hillbilly boogie period lasted into the 1950s and remains one of many subgenres of country into the 21st century.

Bluegrass, folk and gospel

By the end of World War II, "mountaineer" string band music known as bluegrass had emerged when Bill Monroe joined with Lester Flatt and Earl Scruggs, introduced by Roy Acuff at the Grand Ole Opry. That was the ordination of bluegrass music and how Bill Monroe came to be known as the "Father of Bluegrass." Gospel music, too, remained a popular component of bluegrass and other sorts of country music. Red Foley, the biggest country star following World War II, had one of the first million-selling gospel hits ("Peace in the Valley") and also sang boogie, blues and rockabilly. In the post-war period, country music was called "folk" in the trades, and "hillbilly" within the industry. In 1944, Billboard replaced the term "hillbilly" with "folk songs and blues," and switched to "country and Western" in 1949.

Honky tonk

Another type of stripped down and raw music with a variety of moods and a basic ensemble of guitar, bass, dobro or steel guitar (and later) drums became popular, especially among rural residents in the three states of Texhomex, those being Texas, Oklahoma, and New Mexico. It became known as honky tonk and had its roots in Western swing and the ranchera music of Mexico and the border states, particularly New Mexico and Texas, together with the blues of the American South. Bob Wills and His Texas Playboys personified this music which has been described as "a little bit of this, and a little bit of that, a little bit of black and a little bit of white ... just loud enough to keep you from thinking too much and to go right on ordering the whiskey." East Texan Al Dexter had a hit with "Honky Tonk Blues", and seven years later "Pistol Packin' Mama". These "honky tonk" songs were associated with barrooms, and was performed by the likes of Ernest Tubb, Kitty Wells (the first major female country solo singer), Ted Daffan, Floyd Tillman, the Maddox Brothers and Rose, Lefty Frizzell and Hank Williams; the music of these artists would later be called "traditional" country. Williams' influence in particular would prove to be enormous, inspiring many of the pioneers of rock and roll, such as Elvis Presley, Jerry Lee Lewis, Chuck Berry and Ike Turner, while providing a framework for emerging honky tonk talents like George Jones. Webb Pierce was the top-charting country artist of the 1950s, with 13 of his singles spending 113 weeks at number one. He charted 48 singles during the decade; 31 reached the top ten and 26 reached the top four.

Third generation (1950s–1960s)

By the early 1950s, a blend of Western swing, country boogie, and honky tonk was played by most country bands, a mixture which followed in the footsteps of Gene Autry, Lydia Mendoza, Roy Rogers, and Patsy Montana. Western music, influenced by the cowboy ballads, New Mexico, Texas country and Tejano music rhythms of the Southwestern United States and Northern Mexico, reached its peak in popularity in the late 1950s, most notably with the song "El Paso", first recorded by Marty Robbins in September 1959. Western music's influence would continue to grow within the country music sphere, Western musicians like Michael Martin Murphey, New Mexico music artists Al Hurricane and Antonia Apodaca, Tejano music performer Little Joe, and even folk revivalist John Denver, all first rose to prominence during this time. This Western music influence largely kept the music of the folk revival and folk rock from influencing the country music genre much, despite the similarity in instrumentation and origins (see, for instance, the Byrds' negative reception during their appearance on the Grand Ole Opry). The main concern was largely political: most folk revival was largely driven by progressive activists, a stark contrast to the culturally conservative audiences of country music. John Denver was perhaps the only musician to have major success in both the country and folk revival genres throughout his career, later only a handful of artists like Burl Ives and Canadian musician Gordon Lightfoot successfully made the crossover to country after folk revival fell out of fashion. During the mid-1950s a new style of country music became popular, eventually to be referred to as rockabilly.

In 1953, the first all-country radio station was established in Lubbock, Texas. The music of the 1960s and 1970s targeted the American working class, and truckers in particular. As country radio became more popular, trucking songs like the 1963 hit song Six Days on the Road by Dave Dudley began to make up their own subgenre of country. These revamped songs sought to portray American truckers as a "new folk hero", marking a significant shift in sound from earlier country music. The song was written by actual truckers and contained numerous references to the trucker culture of the time like "ICC" for Interstate Commerce Commission and "little white pills" as a reference to amphetamines. Starday Records in Nashville followed up on Dudley's initial success with the release of Give me 40 Acres by the Willis Brothers.

Rockabilly

Rockabilly was most popular with country fans in the 1950s; one of the first rock and roll superstars was former Western yodeler Bill Haley, who repurposed his Four Aces of Western Swing into a rockabilly band in the early 1950s and renamed it the Comets. Bill Haley & His Comets are credited with two of the first successful rock and roll records, "Crazy Man, Crazy" of 1953 and "Rock Around the Clock" in 1954.

1956 could be called the year of rockabilly in country music. Rockabilly was an early form of rock and roll, an upbeat combination of blues and country music. The number two, three and four songs on Billboard's charts for that year were Elvis Presley, "Heartbreak Hotel"; Johnny Cash, "I Walk the Line"; and Carl Perkins, "Blue Suede Shoes". Reflecting this success, George Jones released a rockabilly record that year under the pseudonym "Thumper Jones", wanting to capitalize on the popularity of rockabilly without alienating his traditional country base. Cash and Presley placed songs in the top 5 in 1958 with No. 3 "Guess Things Happen That Way/Come In, Stranger" by Cash, and No. 5 by Presley "Don't/I Beg of You." Presley acknowledged the influence of rhythm and blues artists and his style, saying "The colored folk been singin' and playin' it just the way I'm doin' it now, man for more years than I know." Within a few years, many rockabilly musicians returned to a more mainstream style or had defined their own unique style.

Country music gained national television exposure through Ozark Jubilee on ABC-TV and radio from 1955 to 1960 from Springfield, Missouri. The program showcased top stars including several rockabilly artists, some from the Ozarks. As Webb Pierce put it in 1956, "Once upon a time, it was almost impossible to sell country music in a place like New York City. Nowadays, television takes us everywhere, and country music records and sheet music sell as well in large cities as anywhere else."
 
The Country Music Association was founded in 1958, in part because numerous country musicians were appalled by the increased influence of rock and roll on country music.

The Nashville and countrypolitan sounds

Beginning in the mid-1950s, and reaching its peak during the early 1960s, the Nashville sound turned country music into a multimillion-dollar industry centered in Nashville, Tennessee. Under the direction of producers such as Chet Atkins, Bill Porter, Paul Cohen, Owen Bradley, Bob Ferguson, and later Billy Sherrill, the sound brought country music to a diverse audience and helped revive country as it emerged from a commercially fallow period. This subgenre was notable for borrowing from 1950s pop stylings: a prominent and smooth vocal, backed by a string section (violins and other orchestral strings) and vocal chorus. Instrumental soloing was de-emphasized in favor of trademark "licks". Leading artists in this genre included Jim Reeves, Skeeter Davis, Connie Smith, the Browns, Patsy Cline, and Eddy Arnold. The "slip note" piano style of session musician Floyd Cramer was an important component of this style. The Nashville Sound collapsed in mainstream popularity in 1964, a victim of both the British Invasion and the deaths of Reeves and Cline in separate airplane crashes. By the mid-1960s, the genre had developed into countrypolitan. Countrypolitan was aimed straight at mainstream markets, and it sold well throughout the later 1960s into the early 1970s. Top artists included Tammy Wynette, Lynn Anderson and Charlie Rich, as well as such former "hard country" artists as Ray Price and Marty Robbins. Despite the appeal of the Nashville sound, many traditional country artists emerged during this period and dominated the genre: Loretta Lynn, Merle Haggard, Buck Owens, Porter Wagoner, George Jones, and Sonny James among them.

Country-soul crossover

In 1962, Ray Charles surprised the pop world by turning his attention to country and western music, topping the charts and rating number three for the year on Billboard's pop chart with the "I Can't Stop Loving You" single, and recording the landmark album Modern Sounds in Country and Western Music.

Bakersfield sound
Influenced by one-time West Coast residents Bob Wills and Lefty Frizzell, by 1966 it was known as the Bakersfield sound. It relied on electric instruments and amplification, in particular the Telecaster electric guitar, more than other subgenres of the country music of the era, and it can be described as having a sharp, hard, driving, no-frills, edgy flavor—hard guitars and honky-tonk harmonies. Leading practitioners of this style were Buck Owens, Merle Haggard, Tommy Collins, Dwight Yoakam, Gary Allan, and Wynn Stewart, each of whom had his own style.

Ken Nelson, who had produced Owens and Haggard and Rose Maddox became interested in the trucking song subgenre following the success of Six Days on the Road and asked Red Simpson to record an album of trucking songs. Haggard's White Line Fever was also part of the trucking subgenre.

Western music merges with country

The country music scene of the 1940s until the 1970s was largely dominated by Western music influences, so much so that the genre began to be called "Country and Western". Even today, cowboy and frontier values continue to play a role in the larger country music, with Western wear, cowboy boots, and cowboy hats continues to be in fashion for country artists.

West of the Mississippi river, many of these Western genres continue to flourish, including the Red Dirt of Oklahoma, New Mexico music of New Mexico, and both Texas country music and Tejano music of Texas. During the 1950s until the early 1970s, the latter part of the Western heyday in country music, many of these genres featured popular artists that continue to influence both their distinctive genres and larger country music. Red Dirt featured Bob Childers and Steve Ripley; for New Mexico music Al Hurricane, Al Hurricane Jr., and Antonia Apodaca; and within the Texas scenes Willie Nelson, Freddie Fender, Johnny Rodriguez, and Little Joe.

As Outlaw country music emerged as subgenre in its own right, Red Dirt, New Mexico, Texas country, and Tejano grew in popularity as a part of the Outlaw country movement. Originating in the bars, fiestas, and honky-tonks of Oklahoma, New Mexico, and Texas, their music supplemented outlaw country's singer-songwriter tradition as well as 21st-century rock-inspired alternative country and hip hop-inspired country rap artists.

Fourth generation (1970s–1980s)

Outlaw movement

Outlaw country was derived from the traditional Western, including Red Dirt, New Mexico, Texas country, Tejano, and honky-tonk musical styles of the late 1950s and 1960s. Songs such as the 1963 Johnny Cash popularized "Ring of Fire" show clear influences from the likes of Al Hurricane and Little Joe, this influence just happened to culminate with artists such as Ray Price (whose band, the "Cherokee Cowboys", included Willie Nelson and Roger Miller) and mixed with the anger of an alienated subculture of the nation during the period, a collection of musicians that came to be known as the outlaw movement revolutionized the genre of country music in the early 1970s. "After I left Nashville (the early 70s), I wanted to relax and play the music that I wanted to play, and just stay around Texas, maybe Oklahoma. Waylon and I had that outlaw image going, and when it caught on at colleges and we started selling records, we were O.K. The whole outlaw thing, it had nothing to do with the music, it was something that got written in an article, and the young people said, 'Well, that's pretty cool.' And started listening." (Willie Nelson) The term outlaw country is traditionally associated with Willie Nelson, Jerry Jeff Walker, Hank Williams, Jr., Merle Haggard, Waylon Jennings and Joe Ely. It was encapsulated in the 1976 album Wanted! The Outlaws.

Though the outlaw movement as a cultural fad had died down after the late 1970s (with Jennings noting in 1978 that it had gotten out of hand and led to real-life legal scrutiny), many Western and Outlaw country music artists maintained their popularity during the 1980s by forming supergroups, such as The Highwaymen, Texas Tornados, and Bandido.

Country pop

Country pop or soft pop, with roots in the countrypolitan sound, folk music, and soft rock, is a subgenre that first emerged in the 1970s. Although the term first referred to country music songs and artists that crossed over to top 40 radio, country pop acts are now more likely to cross over to adult contemporary music. It started with pop music singers like Glen Campbell, Bobbie Gentry, John Denver, Olivia Newton-John, Anne Murray, B. J. Thomas, the Bellamy Brothers, and Linda Ronstadt having hits on the country charts. Between 1972 and 1975, singer/guitarist John Denver released a series of hugely successful songs blending country and folk-rock musical styles ("Rocky Mountain High", "Sunshine on My Shoulders", "Annie's Song", "Thank God I'm a Country Boy", and "I'm Sorry"), and was named Country Music Entertainer of the Year in 1975. The year before, Olivia Newton-John, an Australian pop singer, won the "Best Female Country Vocal Performance" as well as the Country Music Association's most coveted award for females, "Female Vocalist of the Year". In response George Jones, Tammy Wynette, Jean Shepard and other traditional Nashville country artists dissatisfied with the new trend formed the short-lived "Association of Country Entertainers" in 1974; the ACE soon unraveled in the wake of Jones and Wynette's bitter divorce and Shepard's realization that most others in the industry lacked her passion for the movement.

During the mid-1970s, Dolly Parton, a successful mainstream country artist since the late 1960s, mounted a high-profile campaign to cross over to pop music, culminating in her 1977 hit "Here You Come Again", which topped the U.S. country singles chart, and also reached No. 3 on the pop singles charts. Parton's male counterpart, Kenny Rogers, came from the opposite direction, aiming his music at the country charts, after a successful career in pop, rock and folk music with the First Edition, achieving success the same year with "Lucille", which topped the country charts and reached No. 5 on the U.S. pop singles charts, as well as reaching Number 1 on the British all-genre chart. Parton and Rogers would both continue to have success on both country and pop charts simultaneously, well into the 1980s. Country music propelled Kenny Rogers’ career, making him a three-time Grammy Award winner and six-time Country Music Association Awards winner. Having sold more than 50 million albums in the US, one of his Song "The Gambler," inspired several TV films, with Rogers as the main character. Artists like Crystal Gayle, Ronnie Milsap and Barbara Mandrell would also find success on the pop charts with their records. In 1975, author Paul Hemphill stated in the Saturday Evening Post, "Country music isn't really country anymore; it is a hybrid of nearly every form of popular music in America."

During the early 1980s, country artists continued to see their records perform well on the pop charts. Willie Nelson and Juice Newton each had two songs in the top 5 of the Billboard Hot 100 in the early eighties: Nelson charted "Always on My Mind" (#5, 1982) and "To All the Girls I've Loved Before" (#5, 1984, a duet with Julio Iglesias), and Newton achieved success with "Queen of Hearts" (#2, 1981) and "Angel of the Morning" (#4, 1981). Four country songs topped the Billboard Hot 100 in the 1980s: "Lady" by Kenny Rogers, from the late fall of 1980; "9 to 5" by Dolly Parton, "I Love a Rainy Night" by Eddie Rabbitt (these two back-to-back at the top in early 1981); and "Islands in the Stream", a duet by Dolly Parton and Kenny Rogers in 1983, a pop-country crossover hit written by Barry, Robin, and Maurice Gibb of the Bee Gees. Newton's "Queen of Hearts" almost reached No. 1, but was kept out of the spot by the pop ballad juggernaut "Endless Love" by Diana Ross and Lionel Richie. The move of country music toward neotraditional styles led to a marked decline in country/pop crossovers in the late 1980s, and only one song in that period—Roy Orbison's "You Got It", from 1989—made the top 10 of both the Billboard Hot Country Singles" and Hot 100 charts, due largely to a revival of interest in Orbison after his sudden death. The only song with substantial country airplay to reach number one on the pop charts in the late 1980s was "At This Moment" by Billy Vera and the Beaters, an R&B song with slide guitar embellishment that appeared at number 42 on the country charts from minor crossover airplay. The record-setting, multi-platinum group Alabama was named Artist of the Decade for the 1980s by the Academy of Country Music.

Country rock

Country rock is a genre that started in the 1960s but became prominent in the 1970s. The late 1960s in American music produced a unique blend as a result of traditionalist backlash within separate genres. In the aftermath of the British Invasion, many desired a return to the "old values" of rock n' roll. At the same time there was a lack of enthusiasm in the country sector for Nashville-produced music. What resulted was a crossbred genre known as country rock. Early innovators in this new style of music in the 1960s and 1970s included Bob Dylan, who was the first to revert to country music with his 1967 album John Wesley Harding (and even more so with that album's follow-up, Nashville Skyline), followed by Gene Clark, Clark's former band the Byrds (with Gram Parsons on Sweetheart of the Rodeo) and its spin-off the Flying Burrito Brothers (also featuring Gram Parsons), guitarist Clarence White, Michael Nesmith (the Monkees and the First National Band), the Grateful Dead, Neil Young, Commander Cody, the Allman Brothers Band, Charlie Daniels, the Marshall Tucker Band, Poco, Buffalo Springfield, Stephen Stills' band Manassas and Eagles, among many, even the former folk music duo Ian & Sylvia, who formed Great Speckled Bird in 1969. The Eagles would become the most successful of these country rock acts, and their compilation album Their Greatest Hits (1971–1975) remains the second-best-selling album in the US with 29 million copies sold. The Rolling Stones also got into the act with songs like "Dead Flowers"; the original recording of "Honky Tonk Women" was performed in a country style, but it was subsequently re-recorded in a hard rock style for the single version, and the band's preferred country version was later released on the album Let It Bleed, under the title "Country Honk".

Described by AllMusic as the "father of country-rock", Gram Parsons' work in the early 1970s was acclaimed for its purity and for his appreciation for aspects of traditional country music. Though his career was cut tragically short by his 1973 death, his legacy was carried on by his protégé and duet partner Emmylou Harris; Harris would release her debut solo in 1975, an amalgamation of country, rock and roll, folk, blues and pop. Subsequent to the initial blending of the two polar opposite genres, other offspring soon resulted, including Southern rock, heartland rock and in more recent years, alternative country. In the decades that followed, artists such as Juice Newton, Alabama, Hank Williams, Jr. (and, to an even greater extent, Hank Williams III), Gary Allan, Shania Twain, Brooks & Dunn, Faith Hill, Garth Brooks, Dwight Yoakam, Steve Earle, Dolly Parton, Rosanne Cash and Linda Ronstadt moved country further towards rock influence.

Neocountry
In 1980, a style of "neocountry disco music" was popularized by the film Urban Cowboy. It was during this time that a glut of pop-country crossover artists began appearing on the country charts: former pop stars Bill Medley (of the Righteous Brothers), "England Dan" Seals (of England Dan and John Ford Coley), Tom Jones, and Merrill Osmond (both alone and with some of his brothers; his younger sister Marie Osmond was already an established country star) all recorded significant country hits in the early 1980s. Sales in record stores rocketed to $250 million in 1981; by 1984, 900 radio stations began programming country or neocountry pop full-time. As with most sudden trends, however, by 1984 sales had dropped below 1979 figures.

Truck driving country

Truck driving country music is a genre of country music
and is a fusion of honky-tonk, country rock and the Bakersfield sound.
It has the tempo of country rock and the emotion of honky-tonk, and its lyrics focus on a truck driver's lifestyle. Truck driving country songs often deal with the profession of trucking and love. Well-known artists who sing truck driving country include Dave Dudley, Red Sovine, Dick Curless, Red Simpson, Del Reeves, the Willis Brothers and Jerry Reed, with C. W. McCall and Cledus Maggard (pseudonyms of Bill Fries and Jay Huguely, respectively) being more humorous entries in the subgenre. Dudley is known as the father of truck driving country.

Neotraditionalist movement

During the mid-1980s, a group of new artists began to emerge who rejected the more polished country-pop sound that had been prominent on radio and the charts, in favor of more, traditional, "back-to-basics" production. Many of the artists during the latter half of the 1980s drew on traditional honky-tonk, bluegrass, folk and western swing. Artists who typified this sound included Travis Tritt, Reba McEntire, George Strait, Keith Whitley, Alan Jackson, John Anderson, Patty Loveless, Kathy Mattea, Randy Travis, Dwight Yoakam, Clint Black, Ricky Skaggs, and the Judds.

Beginning in 1989, a confluence of events brought an unprecedented commercial boom to country music. New marketing strategies were used to engage fans, powered by technology that more accurately tracked the popularity of country music, and boosted by a political and economic climate that focused attention on the genre. Garth Brooks ("Friends in Low Places") in particular attracted fans with his fusion of neotraditionalist country and stadium rock. Other artists such as Brooks and Dunn ("Boot Scootin' Boogie") also combined conventional country with slick, rock elements, while Lorrie Morgan, Mary Chapin Carpenter, and Kathy Mattea updated neotraditionalist styles.

Fifth generation (1990s)

Country music was aided by the U.S. Federal Communications Commission's (FCC) Docket 80–90, which led to a significant expansion of FM radio in the 1980s by adding numerous higher-fidelity FM signals to rural and suburban areas. At this point, country music was mainly heard on rural AM radio stations; the expansion of FM was particularly helpful to country music, which migrated to FM from the AM band as AM became overcome by talk radio (the country music stations that stayed on AM developed the classic country format for the AM audience). At the same time, beautiful music stations already in rural areas began abandoning the format (leading to its effective demise) to adopt country music as well. This wider availability of country music led to producers seeking to polish their product for a wider audience. In 1990, Billboard, which had published a country music chart since the 1940s, changed the methodology it used to compile the chart: singles sales were removed from the methodology, and only airplay on country radio determined a song's place on the chart.

In the 1990s, country music became a worldwide phenomenon thanks to Garth Brooks, who enjoyed one of the most successful careers in popular music history, breaking records for both sales and concert attendance throughout the decade. The RIAA has certified his recordings at a combined (128× platinum), denoting roughly 113 million U.S. shipments. Other artists who experienced success during this time included Clint Black, John Michael Montgomery, Tracy Lawrence, Tim McGraw, Kenny Chesney, Travis Tritt, Alan Jackson and the newly formed duo of Brooks & Dunn; George Strait, whose career began in the 1980s, also continued to have widespread success in this decade and beyond. Toby Keith began his career as a more pop-oriented country singer in the 1990s, evolving into an outlaw persona in the early 2000s with Pull My Chain and its follow-up, Unleashed.

Success of female artists
Female artists such as Reba McEntire, Patty Loveless, Faith Hill, Martina McBride, Deana Carter, LeAnn Rimes, Mindy McCready, Pam Tillis, Lorrie Morgan, Shania Twain, and Mary Chapin Carpenter all released platinum-selling albums in the 1990s. The Dixie Chicks became one of the most popular country bands in the 1990s and early 2000s. Their 1998 debut album Wide Open Spaces went on to become certified 12× platinum while their 1999 album Fly went on to become 10× platinum. After their third album, Home, was released in 2003, the band made political news in part because of lead singer Natalie Maines's comments disparaging then-President George W. Bush while the band was overseas (Maines stated that she and her bandmates were ashamed to be from the same state as Bush, who had just commenced the Iraq War a few days prior). The comments caused a rift between the band and the country music scene, and the band's fourth (and most recent) album, 2006's Taking the Long Way, took a more rock-oriented direction; the album was commercially successful overall among non-country audiences but largely ignored among country audiences. After Taking the Long Way, the band broke up for a decade (with two of its members continuing as the Court Yard Hounds) before reuniting in 2016 and releasing new material in 2020.

Canadian artist Shania Twain became the best selling female country artist of the decade. This was primarily due to the success of her breakthrough sophomore 1995 album, The Woman in Me, which was certified 12× platinum sold over 20 million copies worldwide and its follow-up, 1997's Come On Over, which was certified 20× platinum and sold over 40 million copies. The album became a major worldwide phenomenon and became one of the world's best selling albums for three years (1998, 1999 and 2000); it also went on to become the best selling country album of all time.

Unlike the majority of her contemporaries, Twain enjoyed large international success that had been seen by very few country artists, before or after her. Critics have noted that Twain enjoyed much of her success due to breaking free of traditional country stereotypes and for incorporating elements of rock and pop into her music. In 2002, she released her successful fourth studio album, titled Up!, which was certified 11× platinum and sold over 15 million copies worldwide. Shania Twain has been nominated eighteen times for Grammy Awards and won five Grammys. [] She was the best-paid country music star in 2016 according to Forbes, with a net worth of $27.5 million. []Twain has been credited with breaking international boundaries for country music, as well as inspiring many country artists to incorporate different genres into their music in order to attract a wider audience. She is also credited with changing the way in which many female country performers would market themselves, as unlike many before her she used fashion and her sex appeal to get rid of the stereotypical 'honky-tonk' image the majority of country singers had in order to distinguish herself from many female country artists of the time.

Line dancing revival
In the early-mid-1990s, country western music was influenced by the popularity of line dancing. This influence was so great that Chet Atkins was quoted as saying, "The music has gotten pretty bad, I think. It's all that damn line dancing." By the end of the decade, however, at least one line dance choreographer complained that good country line dance music was no longer being released. In contrast, artists such as Don Williams and George Jones who had more or less had consistent chart success through the 1970s and 1980s suddenly had their fortunes fall rapidly around 1991 when the new chart rules took effect.

Alternative country

Country influences combined with Punk rock and alternative rock to forge the "cowpunk" scene in Southern California during the 1980s, which included bands such as the Long Ryders, Lone Justice and the Beat Farmers, as well as the established punk group X, whose music had begun to include country and rockabilly influences. Simultaneously, a generation of diverse country artists outside of California emerged that rejected the perceived cultural and musical conservatism associated with Nashville's mainstream country musicians in favor of more countercultural outlaw country and the folk singer-songwriter traditions of artists such as Woody Guthrie, Gram Parsons and Bob Dylan.

Artists from outside California who were associated with early alternative country included singer-songwriters such as Lucinda Williams, Lyle Lovett and Steve Earle, the Nashville country rock band Jason and the Scorchers, the Providence "cowboy pop" band Rubber Rodeo, and the British post-punk band the Mekons. Earle, in particular, was noted for his popularity with both country and college rock audiences: He promoted his 1986 debut album Guitar Town with a tour that saw him open for both country singer Dwight Yoakam and alternative rock band the Replacements. Yoakam also cultivated a fanbase spanning multiple genres through his stripped-down honky-tonk influenced sound, association with the cowpunk scene, and performances at Los Angeles punk rock clubs.

These early styles had coalesced into a genre by the time the Illinois group Uncle Tupelo released their influential debut album No Depression in 1990. The album is widely credited as being the first "alternative country" album, and inspired the name of No Depression magazine, which exclusively covered the new genre. Following Uncle Tupelo's disbanding in 1994, its members formed two significant bands in genre: Wilco and Son Volt. Although Wilco's sound had moved away from country and towards indie rock by the time they released their critically acclaimed album Yankee Hotel Foxtrot in 2002, they have continued to be an influence on later alt-country artists.

Other acts who became prominent in the alt-country genre during the 1990s and 2000s included the Bottle Rockets, the Handsome Family, Blue Mountain, Robbie Fulks, Blood Oranges, Bright Eyes, Drive-By Truckers, Old 97's, Old Crow Medicine Show, Nickel Creek, Neko Case, and Whiskeytown, whose lead singer Ryan Adams later had a successful solo-career. Alt-country, in various iterations overlapped with other genres, including Red Dirt country music (Cross Canadian Ragweed), jam bands (My Morning Jacket and the String Cheese Incident), and indie folk (the Avett Brothers).

Despite the genre's growing popularity in the 1980s, 1990s and 2000s, alternative country and neo-traditionalist artists saw minimal support from country radio in those decades, despite strong sales and critical acclaim for albums such as the soundtrack to the 2000 film O Brother, Where Art Thou?. In 1987, the Beat Farmers gained airplay on country music stations with their song "Make It Last", but the single was pulled from the format when station programmers decreed the band's music was too rock-oriented for their audience. However, some alt-country songs have been crossover hits to mainstream country radio in cover versions by established artists on the format; Lucinda Williams' "Passionate Kisses" was a hit for Mary Chapin Carpenter in 1993, Ryan Adams' "When the Stars Go Blue" was a hit for Tim McGraw in 2007, and Old Crow Medicine Show's "Wagon Wheel" was a hit for Darius Rucker (member of Hootie & The Blowfish) in 2013.

In the 2010s, the alt-country genre saw an increase in its critical and commercial popularity, owing to the success of artists such as the Civil Wars, Chris Stapleton, Sturgill Simpson, Jason Isbell, Lydia Loveless and Margo Price. In 2019, Kacey Musgraves – a country artist who had gained a following with indie rock fans and music critics despite minimal airplay on country radio – won the Grammy Award for Album of the Year for her album Golden Hour.

Sixth generation (2000s–present)

The sixth generation of country music continued to be influenced by other genres such as pop, rock, and R&B. Richard Marx crossed over with his Days in Avalon album, which features five country songs and several singers and musicians. Alison Krauss sang background vocals to Marx's single "Straight from My Heart." Also, Bon Jovi had a hit single, "Who Says You Can't Go Home", with Jennifer Nettles of Sugarland. Kid Rock's collaboration with Sheryl Crow, "Picture," was a major crossover hit in 2001 and began Kid Rock's transition from hard rock to a country-rock hybrid that would later produce another major crossover hit, 2008's "All Summer Long." (Crow, whose music had often incorporated country elements, would also officially cross over into country with her hit "Easy" from her debut country album Feels like Home). Darius Rucker, frontman for the 1990s pop-rock band Hootie & the Blowfish, began a country solo career in the late 2000s, one that to date has produced five albums and several hits on both the country charts and the Billboard Hot 100. Singer-songwriter Unknown Hinson became famous for his appearance in the Charlotte television show Wild, Wild, South, after which Hinson started his own band and toured in southern states. Other rock stars who featured a country song on their albums were Don Henley (who released Cass County in 2015, an album which featured collaborations with numerous country artists) and Poison.

The back half of the 2010-2020 decade saw an increasing number of mainstream country acts collaborate with pop and R&B acts; many of these songs achieved commercial success by appealing to fans across multiple genres; examples include collaborations between Kane Brown and Marshmello and Maren Morris and Zedd. There has also been interest from pop singers in country music, including Beyoncé, Lady Gaga, Alicia Keys, Gwen Stefani, Justin Timberlake, Justin Bieber and Pink. Supporting this movement is the new generation of contemporary pop-country, including Taylor Swift, Miranda Lambert, Carrie Underwood, Kacey Musgraves, Miley Cyrus, Billy Ray Cyrus, Sam Hunt, Chris Young, who introduced new themes in their works, touching on fundamental rights, feminism, and controversies about racism and religion of the older generations.

Popular culture

In 2005, country singer Carrie Underwood rose to fame as the winner of the fourth season of American Idol and has since become one of the most prominent recording artists in the genre, with worldwide sales of more than 65 million records and seven Grammy Awards. With her first single, "Inside Your Heaven", Underwood became the only solo country artist to have a number 1 hit on the Billboard Hot 100 chart in the 2000–2009 decade and also broke Billboard chart history as the first country music artist ever to debut at No. 1 on the Hot 100. Underwood's debut album, Some Hearts, became the best-selling solo female debut album in country music history, the fastest-selling debut country album in the history of the SoundScan era and the best-selling country album of the last 10 years, being ranked by Billboard as the number 1 Country Album of the 2000–2009 decade. She has also become the female country artist with the most number one hits on the Billboard Hot Country Songs chart in the Nielsen SoundScan era (1991–present), having 14 #1s and breaking her own Guinness Book record of ten. In 2007, Underwood won the Grammy Award for Best New Artist, becoming only the second Country artist in history (and the first in a decade) to win it. She also made history by becoming the seventh woman to win Entertainer of the Year at the Academy of Country Music Awards, and the first woman in history to win the award twice, as well as twice consecutively. Time has listed Underwood as one of the 100 most influential people in the world.
In 2016, Underwood topped the Country Airplay chart for the 15th time, becoming the female artist with most number ones on that chart.

Carrie Underwood was only one of several country stars produced by a television series in the 2000s. In addition to Underwood, American Idol launched the careers of Kellie Pickler, Josh Gracin, Bucky Covington, Kristy Lee Cook, Danny Gokey, Lauren Alaina and Scotty McCreery (as well as that of occasional country singer Kelly Clarkson) in the decade, and would continue to launch country careers in the 2010s. The series Nashville Star, while not nearly as successful as Idol, did manage to bring Miranda Lambert, Kacey Musgraves and Chris Young to mainstream success, also launching the careers of lower-profile musicians such as Buddy Jewell, Sean Patrick McGraw, and Canadian musician George Canyon. Can You Duet? produced the duos Steel Magnolia and Joey + Rory. Teen sitcoms also have influenced modern country music; in 2008, actress Jennette McCurdy (best known as the sidekick Sam on the teen sitcom iCarly) released her first single, "So Close", following that with the single "Generation Love" in 2011. Another teen sitcom star, Miley Cyrus (of Disney Channel's Hannah Montana), also had a crossover hit in the late 2000s with "The Climb" and another with a duet with her father, Billy Ray Cyrus, with "Ready, Set, Don't Go." Jana Kramer, an actress in the teen drama One Tree Hill, released a country album in 2012 that has produced two hit singles as of 2013. Actresses Hayden Panettiere and Connie Britton began recording country songs as part of their roles in the TV shows Nashville and Pretty Little Liars star Lucy Hale released her debut album Road Between in 2014.

In 2010, the group Lady Antebellum won five Grammys, including the coveted Song of the Year and Record of the Year for "Need You Now". A large number of duos and vocal groups emerged on the charts in the 2010s, many of which feature close harmony in the lead vocals. In addition to Lady A, groups such as Little Big Town, the Band Perry, Gloriana, Thompson Square, Eli Young Band, Zac Brown Band and British duo the Shires have emerged to occupy a large share of mainstream success alongside solo singers such as Kacey Musgraves and Miranda Lambert.

One of the most commercially successful country artists of the late 2000s and early 2010s has been singer-songwriter Taylor Swift. Swift first became widely known in 2006 when her debut single, "Tim McGraw," was released when Swift was only 16 years old. In 2006, Swift released her self-titled debut studio album, which spent 275 weeks on Billboard 200, one of the longest runs of any album on that chart. In 2008, Taylor Swift released her second studio album, Fearless, which made her the second longest number-one charted on Billboard 200 and the second best-selling album (just behind Adele's 21) within the past 5 years. At the 2010 Grammys, Taylor Swift was 20 and won Album of the Year for Fearless, which made her the youngest artist to win this award. Swift has received twelve Grammys already.

Buoyed by her teen idol status among girls and a change in the methodology of compiling the Billboard charts to favor pop-crossover songs, Swift's 2012 single "We Are Never Ever Getting Back Together" spent the most weeks at the top of Billboard's Hot 100 chart and Hot Country Songs chart of any song in nearly five decades.  The song's long run at the top of the chart was somewhat controversial, as the song is largely a pop song without much country influence and its success on the charts driven by a change to the chart's criteria to include airplay on non-country radio stations, prompting disputes over what constitutes a country song; many of Swift's later releases, such as album 1989 (2014), Reputation (2017), and Lover (2019) were released solely to pop audiences. Swift returned to country music in her recent folk-inspired releases, Folklore (2020) and Evermore (2020), with songs like "Betty" and "No Body, No Crime".

Modern variations

Influence of rock, pop and hip-hop 
In the mid to late 2010s, country music began to increasingly sound more like the style of modern-day Pop music, with more simple and repetitive lyrics, more electronic-based instrumentation, and experimentation with "talk-singing" and rap, pop-country pulled farther away from the traditional sounds of country music and received criticisms from country music purists while gaining in popularity with mainstream audiences. The topics addressed have also changed, turning controversial such as acceptance of the LGBT community, safe sex, recreational marijuana use, and questioning religious sentiment. Influences also come from some pop artists' interest in the country genre, including Justin Timberlake with the album Man of the Woods, Beyoncé's single "Daddy Lessons" from Lemonade, Gwen Stefani with "Nobody but You", Bruno Mars, Lady Gaga, Alicia Keys, Kelly Clarkson, and Pink.

The influence of rock music in country has become more overt during the late 2000s and early 2010s as artists like Eric Church, Jason Aldean, and Brantley Gilbert have had success; Aaron Lewis, former frontman for the rock group Staind, had a moderately successful entry into country music in 2011 and 2012, as did Dallas Smith, former frontman of the band Default.

Maren Morris success collaboration "The Middle" with EDM producer Zedd is considered one of the representations of the fusion of electro-pop with country music.

Lil Nas X song "Old Town Road" spent 19 weeks atop the US Billboard Hot 100 chart, becoming the longest-running number-one song since the chart debuted in 1958, winning Billboard Music Awards, MTV Video Music Awards and Grammy Award. Sam Hunt  "Leave the Night On" peaked concurrently on the Hot Country Songs and Country Airplay charts, making Hunt the first country artist in 22 years, since Billy Ray Cyrus, to reach the top of three country charts simultaneously in the Nielsen SoundScan-era. With the fusion genre of "country trap"—a fusion of country/western themes to a hip hop beat, but usually with fully sung lyrics—emerging in the late 2010s, line dancing country had a minor revival, examples of the phenomenon include "The Git Up" by Blanco Brown. Blanco Brown has gone of to make more traditional country soul songs such as "I Need Love" and a rendition of "Don't Take the Girl" with Tim McGraw, and collaborations like "Just the Way" with Parmalee. Another country trap artist known as Breland has seen success with "My Truck, "Throw It Back" with Keith Urban, and "Praise the Lord" featuring Thomas Rhett.

Emo rap musician Sueco, released a cowpunk song in collaboration is country musician Warren Zeiders titled "Ride It Hard". Alex Melton, known for his music covers, blends pop punk with country music.

Bro country 

In the early 2010s, "bro-country", a genre noted primarily for its themes on drinking and partying, girls, and pickup trucks became particularly popular. Notable artists associated with this genre are Luke Bryan, Jason Aldean, Blake Shelton, Jake Owen and Florida Georgia Line whose song "Cruise" became the best-selling country song of all time. Research in the mid-2010s suggested that about 45 percent of country's best-selling songs could be considered bro-country, with the top two artists being Luke Bryan and Florida Georgia Line. Albums by bro-country singers also sold very well—in 2013, Luke Bryan's Crash My Party was the third best-selling of all albums in the United States, with Florida Georgia Line's Here's to the Good Times at sixth, and Blake Shelton's Based on a True Story at ninth.  It is also thought that the popularity of bro-country helped country music to surpass classic rock as the most popular genre in the American country in 2012. The genre however is controversial as it has been criticized by other country musicians and commentators over its themes and depiction of women, opening up a divide between the older generation of country singers and the younger bro country singers that was described as "civil war" by musicians, critics, and journalists." In 2014, Maddie & Tae's "Girl in a Country Song", addressing many of the controversial bro-country themes, peaked at number one on the Billboard Country Airplay chart.

Bluegrass and Americana 

is a genre that contain songs about going through hard times, country loving, and telling stories. Newer artists like Billy Strings, the Grascals, Molly Tuttle, Tyler Childers and the Infamous Stringdusters have been increasing the popularity of this genre, alongside some of the genres more established stars who still remain popular including Rhonda Vincent, Alison Krauss and Union Station, Ricky Skaggs and Del McCoury. The genre has developed in the Northern Kentucky and Cincinnati area. Other artists include New South (band), Doc Watson, Osborne Brothers, and many others.

In an effort to combat the over-reliance of mainstream country music on pop-infused artists, the sister genre of Americana began to gain popularity and increase in prominence, receiving eight Grammy categories of its own in 2009. Americana music incorporates elements of country music, bluegrass, folk, blues, gospel, rhythm and blues, roots rock and southern soul and is overseen by the Americana Music Association and the Americana Music Honors & Awards. As a result of an increasingly pop-leaning mainstream, many more traditional-sounding artists such as Tyler Childers, Zach Bryan and Old Crow Medicine Show began to associate themselves more with Americana and the alternative country scene where their sound was more celebrated. Similarly, many established country acts who no longer received commercial airplay, including Emmylou Harris and Lyle Lovett, began to flourish again.

Contemporary country and Western revival 

During the mid-1980s, a group of new artists began to emerge who rejected the more polished country-pop sound that had been prominent on radio and the charts, in favor of more, traditional, "back-to-basics" production. Many of the artists during the latter half of the 1980s drew on traditional honky-tonk, bluegrass, folk and western swing. Artists who typified this sound included Travis Tritt, Reba McEntire, George Strait, Keith Whitley, Alan Jackson, John Anderson, Patty Loveless, Kathy Mattea, Randy Travis, Dwight Yoakam, Clint Black, Ricky Skaggs, and the Judds.

Beginning in 1989, a confluence of events brought an unprecedented commercial boom to country music. New marketing strategies were used to engage fans, powered by technology that more accurately tracked the popularity of country music, and boosted by a political and economic climate that focused attention on the genre. Garth Brooks ("Friends in Low Places") in particular attracted fans with his fusion of neotraditionalist country and stadium rock. Other artists such as Brooks and Dunn ("Boot Scootin' Boogie") also combined conventional country with slick, rock elements, while Lorrie Morgan, Mary Chapin Carpenter, and Kathy Mattea updated neotraditionalist styles.

Roots of conservative country was Lee Greenwood's "God Bless the USA". The September 11 attacks of 2001 and the economic recession helped move country music back into the spotlight. Many country artists, such as Alan Jackson with his ballad on terrorist attacks, "Where Were You (When the World Stopped Turning)", wrote songs that celebrated the military, highlighted the gospel, and emphasized home and family values over wealth. Alt-Country singer Ryan Adams song "New York, New York" pays tribute to New York City, and its popular music video (which was shot 4 days before the attacks) shows Adams playing in front of the Manhattan skyline, Along with several shots of the city. In contrast, more rock-oriented country singers took more direct aim at the attacks' perpetrators; Toby Keith's "Courtesy of the Red, White and Blue (The Angry American)" threatened to "a boot in" the posterior of the enemy, while Charlie Daniels's "This Ain't No Rag, It's a Flag" promised to "hunt" the perpetrators "down like a mad dog hound." These songs gained such recognition that it put country music back into popular culture. Darryl Worley recorded "Have You Forgotten" also. There have been numerous patriotic country songs throughout the years.

Some modern artists that primarily or entirely produce country pop music include Kacey Musgraves, Maren Morris, Kelsea Ballerini, Sam Hunt, Kane Brown, Chris Lane, and Dan + Shay. The singers who are part of this country movement are also defined as "Nashville's new generation of country".

Although the changes made by the new generation, it has been recognized by major music awards associations and successes in Billboard and international charts. Golden Hour by Kacey Musgraves won album of the year at 61st Annual Grammy Awards, Academy of Country Music Awards, Country Music Association Awards, although it has received widespread criticism from the more traditionalist public.

Due to the success of video game Red Dead Redemption, the Western genre once again became a part of popular culture. The Western music style likewise garnered a popular revival. Following which Western music genres such as New Mexico music, Tejano and Texas country music have become host to numerous contemporary neotraditional musicians, outlets like Los 15 Grandes de Nuevo México, Texas Country Music Chart, and Tejano Nation cover these genres. Artists currently paving the way for the subgenres include Cody Johnson, Shawn Brooks, Midland, Josh Grider, Aaron Watson, Str8 Shot, Randy Rogers Band, Dynette Marie Cordova, Mario Lucero, Roger Creager, Dawn Luz, and Pat Green. Musicians like Lorenzo Antonio are successful in both Mexico and the US, much like Freddy Fender, Johnny Rodriguez, and Al Hurricane did in the past. That crossover in ongoing, with Midland doing a Spanish-language cover of their song "Drinkin' Song" with Jay De La Cueva, and other Mexican artists have begun to have success performing neotraditional-style including Chiquis Rivera, Joss Favela, Carin Leon, Becky G, and Teo & Diego. Even pop musicians with New Mexico and Texas origins, like Demi Lovato, have had country music success. Traditional Western musicians Colter Wall and Poor Mans Poison have had viral songs, such as "Hell's Comin' With Me" by Poor Man's Poison.

International

Australia

Australian country music has a long tradition. Influenced by US country music, it has developed a distinct style, shaped by British and Irish folk ballads and Australian bush balladeers like Henry Lawson and Banjo Paterson. Country instruments, including the guitar, banjo, fiddle and harmonica, create the distinctive sound of country music in Australia and accompany songs with strong storyline and memorable chorus.

Folk songs sung in Australia between the 1780s and 1920s, based around such themes as the struggle against government tyranny, or the lives of bushrangers, swagmen, drovers, stockmen and shearers, continue to influence the genre. This strain of Australian country, with lyrics focusing on Australian subjects, is generally known as "bush music" or "bush band music". "Waltzing Matilda", often regarded as Australia's unofficial national anthem, is a quintessential Australian country song, influenced more by British and Irish folk ballads than by US country and western music. The lyrics were composed by the poet Banjo Paterson in 1895. Other popular songs from this tradition include "The Wild Colonial Boy", "Click Go the Shears", "The Queensland Drover" and "The Dying Stockman". Later themes which endure to the present include the experiences of war, of droughts and flooding rains, of Aboriginality and of the railways and trucking routes which link Australia's vast distances.

Pioneers of a more Americanised popular country music in Australia included Tex Morton (known as "The Father of Australian Country Music") in the 1930s. Author Andrew Smith delivers a through research and engaged view of Tex Morton's life and his impact on the country music scene in Australia in the 1930s and 1940s. Other early stars included Buddy Williams, Shirley Thoms and Smoky Dawson. Buddy Williams (1918–1986) was the first Australian-born to record country music in Australia in the late 1930s and was the pioneer of a distinctly Australian style of country music called the bush ballad that others such as Slim Dusty would make popular in later years. During the Second World War, many of Buddy Williams recording sessions were done whilst on leave from the Army. At the end of the war, Williams would go on to operate some of the largest travelling tent rodeo shows Australia has ever seen.

In 1952, Dawson began a radio show and went on to national stardom as a singing cowboy of radio, TV and film. Slim Dusty (1927–2003) was known as the "King of Australian Country Music" and helped to popularise the Australian bush ballad. His successful career spanned almost six decades, and his 1957 hit "A Pub with No Beer" was the biggest-selling record by an Australian to that time, and with over seven million record sales in Australia he is the most successful artist in Australian musical history. Dusty recorded and released his one-hundredth album in the year 2000 and was given the honour of singing "Waltzing Matilda" in the closing ceremony of the Sydney 2000 Olympic Games. Dusty's wife Joy McKean penned several of his most popular songs.

Chad Morgan, who began recording in the 1950s, has represented a vaudeville style of comic Australian country; Frank Ifield achieved considerable success in the early 1960s, especially in the UK Singles Charts and Reg Lindsay was one of the first Australians to perform at Nashville's Grand Ole Opry in 1974. Eric Bogle's 1972 folk lament to the Gallipoli Campaign "And the Band Played Waltzing Matilda" recalled the British and Irish origins of Australian folk-country. Singer-songwriter Paul Kelly, whose music style straddles folk, rock and country, is often described as the poet laureate of Australian music. 

By the 1990s, country music had attained crossover success in the pop charts, with artists like James Blundell and James Reyne singing "Way Out West", and country star Kasey Chambers winning the ARIA Award for Best Female Artist in three years (2000, 2002 and 2004), tying with pop stars Wendy Matthews and Sia for the most wins in that category. Furthermore, Chambers has gone on to win nine ARIA Awards for Best Country Album and, in 2018, became the youngest artist to ever be inducted into the ARIA Hall of Fame. The crossover influence of Australian country is also evident in the music of successful contemporary bands the Waifs and the John Butler Trio. Nick Cave has been heavily influenced by the country artist Johnny Cash. In 2000, Cash, covered Cave's "The Mercy Seat" on the album American III: Solitary Man, seemingly repaying Cave for the compliment he paid by covering Cash's "The Singer" (originally "The Folk Singer") on his Kicking Against the Pricks album. Subsequently, Cave cut a duet with Cash on a version of Hank Williams' "I'm So Lonesome I Could Cry" for Cash's American IV: The Man Comes Around album (2002).

Popular contemporary performers of Australian country music include John Williamson (who wrote the iconic "True Blue"), Lee Kernaghan (whose hits include "Boys from the Bush" and "The Outback Club"), Gina Jeffreys, Forever Road and Sara Storer. In the U.S., Olivia Newton-John, Sherrié Austin and Keith Urban have attained great success. During her time as a country singer in the 1970s, Newton-John became the first (and to date only) non-US winner of the Country Music Association Award for Female Vocalist of the Year which many considered a controversial decision by the CMA; after starring in the rock-and-roll musical film Grease in 1978, Newton-John (mirroring the character she played in the film) shifted to pop music in the 1980s. Urban is arguably considered the most successful international Australian country star, winning nine CMA Awards, including three Male Vocalist of the Year wins and two wins of the CMA's top honour Entertainer of the Year. Pop star Kylie Minogue found success with her 2018 country pop album Golden which she recorded in Nashville reaching number one in Scotland, the UK and her native Australia.

Country music has been a particularly popular form of musical expression among Indigenous Australians. Troy Cassar-Daley is among Australia's successful contemporary indigenous performers, and Kev Carmody and Archie Roach employ a combination of folk-rock and country music to sing about Aboriginal rights issues.

The Tamworth Country Music Festival began in 1973 and now attracts up to 100,000 visitors annually. Held in Tamworth, New South Wales (country music capital of Australia), it celebrates the culture and heritage of Australian country music. During the festival the CMAA holds the Country Music Awards of Australia ceremony awarding the Golden Guitar trophies.  Other significant country music festivals include the Whittlesea Country Music Festival (near Melbourne) and the Mildura Country Music Festival for "independent" performers during October, and the Canberra Country Music Festival held in the national capital during November.

Country HQ showcases new talent on the rise in the country music scene down under. CMC (the Country Music Channel), a 24‑hour music channel dedicated to non-stop country music, can be viewed on pay TV and features once a year the Golden Guitar Awards, CMAs and CCMAs alongside international shows such as The Wilkinsons, The Road Hammers, and Country Music Across America.

Canada

Outside of the United States, Canada has the largest country music fan and artist base, something that is to be expected given the two countries' proximity and cultural parallels. Mainstream country music is culturally ingrained in the prairie provinces, the British Columbia Interior, Ontario, and in Atlantic Canada. Celtic traditional music developed in Atlantic Canada in the form of Scottish, Acadian and Irish folk music popular amongst Irish, French and Scottish immigrants to Canada's Atlantic Provinces (Newfoundland, Nova Scotia, New Brunswick, and Prince Edward Island). Like the southern United States and Appalachia, all four regions are of heavy British Isles stock and rural; as such, the development of traditional music in the Maritimes somewhat mirrored the development of country music in the US South and Appalachia. Country and Western music never really developed separately in Canada; however, after its introduction to Canada, following the spread of radio, it developed quite quickly out of the Atlantic Canadian traditional scene. While true Atlantic Canadian traditional music is very Celtic or "sea shanty" in nature, even today, the lines have often been blurred. Certain areas often are viewed as embracing one strain or the other more openly. For example, in Newfoundland the traditional music remains unique and Irish in nature, whereas traditional musicians in other parts of the region may play both genres interchangeably.

Don Messer's Jubilee was a Halifax, Nova Scotia-based country/folk variety television show that was broadcast nationally from 1957 to 1969. In Canada it out-performed The Ed Sullivan Show broadcast from the United States and became the top-rated television show throughout much of the 1960s. Don Messer's Jubilee followed a consistent format throughout its years, beginning with a tune named "Goin' to the Barndance Tonight", followed by fiddle tunes by Messer, songs from some of his "Islanders" including singers Marg Osburne and Charlie Chamberlain, the featured guest performance, and a closing hymn. It ended with "Till We Meet Again". The guest performance slot gave national exposure to numerous Canadian folk musicians, including Stompin' Tom Connors and Catherine McKinnon. Some Maritime country performers went on to further fame beyond Canada. Hank Snow, Wilf Carter (also known as Montana Slim), and Anne Murray are the three most notable. The cancellation of the show by the public broadcaster in 1969 caused a nationwide protest, including the raising of questions in the Parliament of Canada.

The Prairie provinces, due to their western cowboy and agrarian nature, are the true heartland of Canadian country music. While the Prairies never developed a traditional music culture anything like the Maritimes, the folk music of the Prairies often reflected the cultural origins of the settlers, who were a mix of Scottish, Ukrainian, German and others. For these reasons polkas and Western music were always popular in the region, and with the introduction of the radio, mainstream country music flourished. As the culture of the region is western and frontier in nature, the specific genre of country and western is more popular today in the Prairies than in any other part of the country. No other area of the country embraces all aspects of the culture, from two-step dancing, to the cowboy dress, to rodeos, to the music itself, like the Prairies do. The Atlantic Provinces, on the other hand, produce far more traditional musicians, but they are not usually specifically country in nature, usually bordering more on the folk or Celtic genres.

Canadian country pop star Shania Twain is the best-selling female country artist of all time and one of the best-selling artists of all time in any genre. Furthermore, she is the only woman to have three consecutive albums be certified Diamond.

Mexico and Latin America

Country music artists from the U.S. have seen crossover appeal with Latin American audiences, particularly in Mexico. Especially artists from the Southwestern United States in the genres of New Mexico music and Tejano "Tex-Mex" which are popular, throughout Latin America, beyond their New Mexico and Texas audiences. Many Country music artists from throughout the U.S. have recorded renditions of Mexican folk songs, including "El Rey" which was performed on George Strait's Twang album and during Al Hurricane's tribute concert. Even American Latin pop crossover musicians, like Lorenzo Antonio's "Ranchera Jam" have combined Mexican staples "Cielito Lindo" and Tito Guízar's "Allá en el Rancho Grande" with country music classics Johnny Cash's "Folsom Prison Blues" and Hank Williams' "Jambalaya (On the Bayou)", in a New Mexico music style.

While Tejano and New Mexico music is typically thought of as being Spanish language, the genres have had numerous charting musicians that have primarily focused on English language music. During the 1970s, singer-songwriter Freddy Fender had two #1 country music singles, that were popular throughout North America, with "Before the Next Teardrop Falls" and "Wasted Days and Wasted Nights". Songs inspired by Hispanic and Latin culture have long been performed by US country music artists, including Marty Robbins' "El Paso" trilogy, Willie Nelson and Merle Haggard covering the Townes Van Zandt song "Pancho and Lefty", "Toes" by Zac Brown Band, and "Sangria" by Blake Shelton.

Regional Mexican is a radio format featuring many of Mexico's versions of country music. It includes a number of different styles, usually named after their region of origin. One specific song style, the Canción Ranchera, or simply Ranchera, literally meaning "ranch song", found its origins in the Mexican countryside and was first popularized with Mariachi. It has since also become popular with Grupero, Banda, Norteño, Tierra Caliente, Duranguense and other regional Mexican styles. The Corrido, a different song style with a similar history, is also performed in many other regional styles, and is most related to the Western style of the United States and Canada. Other song styles performed in regional Mexican music include Ballads, Cumbias, Boleros, among others. Country en Español (Country in Spanish) is also popular in Mexico. Some Mexican artists began performing country songs in Spanish during the 1970s, and the genre became prominent mainly in the northern regions of the country during the 1980s. A Country en Español popularity boom also reached the central regions of Mexico during the 1990s. For most of its history, Country en Español mainly resembled Neotraditional country. However, in more modern times, some artists have incorporated influences from other country music subgenres.
 
In Brazil, there is Música Sertaneja, the most popular music genre in that country. It originated in the countryside of São Paulo state in the 1910s, before the development of US country music.

In Argentina, on the last weekend of September, the yearly San Pedro Country Music Festival takes place in the town of San Pedro, Buenos Aires. The festival features bands from different places in Argentina, as well as international artists from Brazil, Uruguay, Chile, Peru and the U.S.

United Kingdom

Country music is popular in the United Kingdom, although somewhat less so than in other English-speaking countries. There are some British country music acts and publications. Although radio stations devoted to country are among the most popular in other Anglophone nations, none of the top ten most-listened-to stations in the UK are country stations, and national broadcaster BBC Radio does not offer a full-time country station (BBC Radio 2 Country, a "pop-up" station, operated four days each year between 2015 and 2017). The BBC does offer a country show on BBC Radio 2 each week hosted by Bob Harris.

The most successful British country music act of the 21st century are Ward Thomas and the Shires. In 2015, the Shires' album Brave, became the first UK country act ever to chart in the Top 10 of the UK Albums Chart and they became the first UK country act to receive an award from the American Country Music Association. In 2016, Ward Thomas then became the first UK country act to hit number 1 in the UK Albums Chart with their album Cartwheels.

There is the C2C: Country to Country festival held every year, and for many years there was a festival at Wembley Arena, which was broadcast on the BBC, the International Festivals of Country Music, promoted by Mervyn Conn, held at the venue between 1969 and 1991. The shows were later taken into Europe, and featured such stars as Johnny Cash, Dolly Parton, Tammy Wynette, David Allan Coe, Emmylou Harris, Boxcar Willie, Johnny Russell and Jerry Lee Lewis. A handful of country musicians had even greater success in mainstream British music than they did in the U.S., despite a certain amount of disdain from the music press. Britain's largest music festival Glastonbury has featured major US country acts in recent years, such as Kenny Rogers in 2013 and Dolly Parton in 2014.

From within the UK, few country musicians achieved widespread mainstream success. Many British singers who performed the occasional country songs are of other genres. Tom Jones, by this point near the end of his peak success as a pop singer, had a string of country hits in the late 1970s and early 1980s. The Bee Gees had some fleeting success in the genre, with one country hit as artists ("Rest Your Love on Me") and a major hit as songwriters ("Islands in the Stream"); Barry Gibb, the band's usual lead singer and last surviving member, acknowledged that country music was a major influence on the band's style. Singer Engelbert Humperdinck, while charting only once in the U.S. country top 40 with "After the Lovin'," achieved widespread success on both the U.S. and British pop charts with his covers of Nashville country ballads such as "Release Me," "Am I That Easy to Forget" and "There Goes My Everything." The songwriting tandem of Roger Cook and Roger Greenaway wrote a number of country hits, in addition to their widespread success in pop songwriting; Cook is notable for being the only Briton to be inducted into the Nashville Songwriters Hall of Fame. Welsh singer Bonnie Tyler initially started her career making country records, and in 1978 her single "It's a Heartache" reached number four on the UK Singles Chart. In 2013, Tyler returned to her roots, blending the country elements of her early work with the rock of her successful material on her album Rocks and Honey which featured a duet with Vince Gill.

A niche country subgenre popular in the West Country is Scrumpy and Western, which consists mostly of novelty songs and comedy music recorded there (its name comes from scrumpy, an alcoholic beverage). A primarily local interest, the largest Scrumpy and Western hit in the UK and Ireland was "The Combine Harvester," which pioneered the genre and reached number one in both the UK and Ireland; Fred Wedlock had a number-six hit in 1981 with "The Oldest Swinger in Town."

The British Country Music Festival is an annual three-day festival held in the seaside resort of Blackpool. It uniquely promotes artists from the United Kingdom and Ireland to celebrate the impact that Celtic and British settlers to America had on the origins of country music. Past headline artists have included Amy Wadge, Ward Thomas, Tom Odell, Nathan Carter, Lisa McHugh, Catherine McGrath, Wildwood Kin, The Wandering Hearts and Henry Priestman.

Ireland

In Ireland, Country and Irish is a music genre that combines traditional Irish folk music with US country music. Television channel TG4 began a quest for Ireland's next country star called Glór Tíre, translated as "Country Voice". It is now in its sixth season and is one of TG4's most-watched TV shows. Over the past ten years, country and gospel recording artist James Kilbane has reached multi-platinum success with his mix of Christian and traditional country influenced albums. James Kilbane like many other Irish artists is today working closer with Nashville. Daniel O'Donnell achieved international success with his brand of music crossing country, Irish folk and European easy listening, earning a strong following among older women both in the British Isles and in North America. A recent success in the Irish arena has been Crystal Swing.

Japan and Asia

In Japan, there are forms of J-country and J-Western similar to other J-pop movements, J-hip hop and J-rock. One of the first J-Western musicians was Biji Kuroda & The Chuck Wagon Boys, other vintage artists included Jimmie Tokita and His Mountain Playboys, The Blue Rangers, Wagon Aces, and Tomi Fujiyama. J-country continues to have a dedicated following in Japan, thanks to Charlie Nagatani, Katsuoshi Suga, J.T. Kanehira, Dicky Kitano, and Manami Sekiya. Country and Western venues in Japan include the former annual Country Gold which were put together by Charlie Nagatani, and the modern honky tonks at Little Texas in Tokyo and Armadillo in Nagoya.

In India, there is an annual concert festival called "Blazing Guitars" held in Chennai brings together Anglo-Indian musicians from all over the country (including some who have emigrated to places like Australia). The year 2003 brought home-grown Indian, Bobby Cash to the forefront of the country music culture in India when he became India's first international country music artist to chart singles in Australia.

In the Philippines, country music has found their way into Cordilleran way of life, which often compares the Igorot lifestyle to that of US cowboys. Baguio City has an FM station that caters to country music, DZWR 99.9 Country, which is part of the Catholic Media Network. Bombo Radyo Baguio has a segment on its Sunday slot for Igorot, Ilocano and country music. And as of recently, DWUB occasionally plays country music. Many country music musicians tour the Philippines. Original Pinoy Music has influences from country.

Other international country music
Tom Roland, from the Country Music Association International, explains country music's global popularity: "In this respect, at least, Country Music listeners around the globe have something in common with those in the United States. In Germany, for instance, Rohrbach identifies three general groups that gravitate to the genre: people intrigued with the US cowboy icon, middle-aged fans who seek an alternative to harder rock music and younger listeners drawn to the pop-influenced sound that underscores many current Country hits." One of the first US people to perform country music abroad was George Hamilton IV. He was the first country musician to perform in the Soviet Union; he also toured in Australia and the Middle East. He was deemed the "International Ambassador of Country Music" for his contributions to the globalization of country music. Johnny Cash, Emmylou Harris, Keith Urban, and Dwight Yoakam have also made numerous international tours. The Country Music Association undertakes various initiatives to promote country music internationally.

Middle East
In Iran, country music has appeared in recent years. According to Melody Music Magazine, the pioneer of country music in Iran is the English-speaking country music band Dream Rovers, whose founder, singer and songwriter is Erfan Rezayatbakhsh (elf). The band was formed in 2007 in Tehran, and during this time they have been trying to introduce and popularize country music in Iran by releasing two studio albums and performing live at concerts, despite the difficulties that the Islamic regime in Iran makes for bands that are active in the western music field.

Musician Toby Keith performed alongside Saudi Arabian folk musician Rabeh Sager in 2017. This concert was similar to the performances of Jazz ambassadors that performed distinctively American style music internationally.

Continental Europe

In Sweden, Rednex rose to stardom combining country music with electro-pop in the 1990s. In 1994, the group had a worldwide hit with their version of the traditional Southern tune "Cotton-Eyed Joe". Artists popularizing more traditional country music in Sweden have been Ann-Louise Hanson, Hasse Andersson, Kikki Danielsson, Elisabeth Andreassen and Jill Johnson. In Poland an international country music festival, known as Piknik Country, has been organised in Mrągowo in Masuria since 1983. The number of country music artists in France has increased. Some of the most important are Liane Edwards, Annabel, Rockie Mountains, Tahiana, and Lili West. French rock and roll singer Eddy Mitchell is also inspired by Americana and country music.

In the Netherlands there are many artists producing popular country and Americana music, which is mostly in the English language, as well as Dutch country and country-like music in the Dutch language. The latter is mainly popular on the countrysides in the northern and eastern parts of the Netherlands and is less associated with its US brethren, although it sounds sometimes very similar. Well-known popular artists mainly performing in English are Waylon, Danny Vera, Ilse DeLange, Douwe Bob and Henk Wijngaard.

Performers and shows

US cable television
Several US television networks are at least partly devoted to the genre: Country Music Television (the first channel devoted to country music) and CMT Music (both owned by Paramount Global), RFD-TV and The Cowboy Channel (both owned by Rural Media Group), Heartland (owned by Get After It Media), Circle (a joint venture of the Grand Ole Opry and Gray Television), and The Country Network (owned by TCN Country, LLC).

The Nashville Network (TNN) was launched in 1983 as a channel devoted to country music, and later added sports and outdoor lifestyle programming. It actually launched just two days after CMT. In 2000, after TNN and CMT fell under the same corporate ownership, TNN was stripped of its country format and rebranded as The National Network, then Spike TV in 2003, Spike in 2006, and finally Paramount Network in 2018. TNN was later revived from 2012 to 2013 after Jim Owens Entertainment (the company responsible for prominent TNN hosts Crook & Chase) acquired the trademark and licensed it to Luken Communications; that channel renamed itself Heartland after Luken was embroiled in an unrelated dispute that left the company bankrupt.

Great American Country (GAC) was launched in 1995, also as a country music-oriented channel that would later add lifestyle programming pertaining to the American Heartland and South. In Spring 2021, GAC's then-owner, Discovery, Inc. divested the network to GAC Media, which also acquired the equestrian network Ride TV. Later, in the summer of that year, GAC Media relaunched Great American Country as GAC Family, a family-oriented general entertainment network, while Ride TV was relaunched as GAC Living, a network devoted to programming pertaining to lifestyles of the American South. The GAC acronym which once stood for "Great American Country" now stands for "Great American Channels".

Canadian television

Only one television channel was dedicated to country music in Canada: CMT owned by Corus Entertainment (90%) and Viacom (10%). However, the lifting of strict genre licensing restrictions saw the network remove the last of its music programming at the end of August 2017 for a schedule of generic off-network family sitcoms, Cancom-compliant lifestyle programming, and reality programming. In the past, the current-day Cottage Life network saw some country focus as Country Canada and later, CBC Country Canada before that network drifted into an alternate network for overflow CBC content as Bold. Stingray Music continues to maintain several country music audio-only channels on cable radio.

In the past, country music had an extensive presence, especially on the Canadian national broadcaster, CBC Television. The show Don Messer's Jubilee significantly affected country music in Canada; for instance, it was the program that launched Anne Murray's career. Gordie Tapp's Country Hoedown and its successor, The Tommy Hunter Show, ran for a combined 36 years on the CBC, from 1956 to 1992; in its last nine years on air, the U.S. cable network TNN carried Hunter's show.

Australian cable television
The only network dedicated to country music in Australia was the Country Music Channel owned by Foxtel. It ceased operations in June 2020 and was replaced by CMT (owned by Network 10 parent company Paramount Networks UK & Australia).

British digital television
One music video channel is now dedicated to country music in the United Kingdom: Spotlight TV, owned by Canis Media.

Festivals

Criticism

Subgenres misrepresented on streaming services 
Computer science and music experts identified issues with algorithms on streaming services such as Spotify and Apple Music, specifically the categorical homogenization of music curation and metadata within larger genres such as country music. Musicians and songs from minority heritage styles, such as Appalachian, Cajun, New Mexico, and Tejano music, underperform on these platforms due to underrepresentation and miscategorization of these subgenres.

Race issue in modern country music 
The Country Music Association has awarded the New Artist award to a black American only twice in 63 years, and never to a Hispanic musician. The broader modern Nashville-based Country music industry has underrepresented significant black and Latino contributions within Country music, including popular subgenres such as Cajun, Creole, Tejano, and New Mexico music. A 2021 CNN article states, "Some in country music have signaled that they are no longer content to be associated with a painful history of racism."

Black country-music artist Mickey Guyton has been included among the nominees for the 2021 award, effectively creating a litmus-test for the genre. Guyton has expressed bewilderment that, despite substantial coverage by online platforms like Spotify and Apple Music, her music, like that of Valerie June, another black musician who embraces aspects of country in her Appalachian- and Gospel-tinged work and who has been embraced by international music audiences, is still effectively ignored by American broadcast country-music radio. Guyton's 2021 album Remember Her Name in part references the case of black health-care professional Breonna Taylor, who was killed in her home by police.

See also

 American Country Countdown Awards
 Canadian Country Music Association
 CMT Music Awards
 Country (identity)
 Country and Irish
 Country Music Hall of Fame and Museum
 Country-western dance
 Culture of the Southern United States
 Music genre
 List of country music performers
 List of RPM number-one country singles
 Music of the United States
 Pop music
 Western Music Association
 2021 in country music

References

Further reading

 
 
 
 

 
 Thomas S. Johnson (1981) "That Ain't Country: The Distinctiveness of Commercial Western Music" JEMF Quarterly. Vol. 17, No. 62. Summer, 1981. pp 75–84.
 
 
 Bill Legere (1977). Record Collectors Guide of Country LPs. Limited ed. Mississauga, Ont.: W.J. Legere. 269, 25, 29, 2 p., thrice perforated and looseleaf. Without ISBN
 Bill Legere ([1977]). E[lectrical] T[anscription]s: Transcription Library of Bill Legere. Mississauga, Ont.: B. Legere. 3 vols., each of which is thrice perforated and looseleaf. N.B.: Vol. 1–2, Country Artists—vol. 2, Pop Artists. Without ISBN
 
 
 Diane Pecknold (ed.) Hidden in the Mix: The African American Presence in Country Music. Durham, NC: Duke University Press, 2013.

External links

 The Country Music Association – Nashville, Tennessee(CMA)
 Western Music Association (WMA) 
 Country Music Hall of Fame and Museum – Nashville, Tennessee
 Grand Ole Opry – Nashville, Tennessee
 Irish country music
 Country Music Festivals Ontario Website
 Nashville Songwriters Hall of Fame Foundation
 TIME Archive of country music's progression
 Xroad.virginia.edu, alt country from American Studies at the University of Virginia
 Largest collection of online Country music radio stations
 Kingwood Kowboy's History Of Country Music

2021
1920s in music
1930s in music
1940s in music
1950s in music
1960s in music
1970s in music
1980s in music
1990s in music
2000s in music
2010s in music
2020s in music
African-American music
American styles of music
Culture of the Southern United States
Radio formats